In tennis, the first edition of the US Open Series was contested in 2004.

2004 schedule

Standings

ATP

WTA

Notes